The Constitution of Venezuela of 1830 (official name: Constitution of the State of Venezuela. Spanish: Constitución del Estado de Venezuela) was the fourth Magna Carta in force in Venezuela from 1830 to 1857, being the second most valid Venezuelan fundamental law. Approved by the Constituent Congress of Valencia, on September 22, 1830 and promulgated by General José Antonio Páez two days later. The Constituent Congress of 1830 that sanctioned it had begun its sessions in the city of Valencia on May 6, 1830, with the attendance of 33 deputies of the 48 that had been elected in representation of the provinces of Cumaná, Barcelona, Margarita, Caracas, Carabobo, Coro, Mérida, Barinas, Apure, Barquisimeto, Guayana and Maracaibo. In March 1857 this text was repealed when the Constitution of 1857 was approved and promulgated.

The end of the validity of the constitutional text of 1830 marked the beginning of a period through which many constitutional texts would be promulgated with the sole intention of perpetuating the Venezuelan caudillo in the presidency of the Republic. The Revolution of the Reforms of 1836, the social revolts promoted by Antonio Leocadio Guzmán in 1842, the sectarianism of the Conservative Party, the assault on the National Congress in 1848, the first government of José Tadeo Monagas and the subsequent election of his brother José Gregorio Monagas, represent the political context of post-independence Venezuela. The Congress of Valencia designed the national organization by means of the three classic public powers, namely: Legislative, Executive and Judicial.

Composition and characteristics 
It consists of a Preamble and 228 articles distributed in 28 Titles.

Preamble

Title One: Of the Venezuelan Nation and its territory. 
The first title comprises articles one through five, and establishes the principles of sovereignty and independence and the geographic understanding under the principle of Uti possidetis iuris and the territorial organization of the Nation, as stated in Article 5:

Title Two: Government of Venezuela 
The second title comprises articles six through eight, and establishes the form of government adopted by the Nation, the exercise of sovereignty by the people and the composition of the national power, called in the referred Constitution as the Supreme Power; such as the Legislative, Executive and Judicial Powers.

Title Three: About Venezuelans 
The third title comprises articles 9 to 11, and establishes the principles of nationality, either by birth or by naturalization. Article 11 refers to naturalization, where any man can adopt the nationality if he has participated in the independence cause.

Title Four. Of the duties of Venezuelans. 
The fourth title comprised only one article, Article 12, and established the duties of citizens. It read as follows:

Title Five. On the political rights of Venezuelans. 
The fifth title comprises articles 13 to 16, and establishes the constitutional guarantees for the inhabitants of the Nation, which had a classification of the persons who could enjoy or not the referred guarantees or the persons whose exercise of rights could be suspended. Article 14 states that only the following have rights:

At the same time, the following article lists the citizens who lose these rights:

The present title of the Constitution does not contain a declaration of fundamental rights like other constitutional provisions, but only deals with the citizens entitled to assume public office and/or the exercise of suffrage.

Electoral system 
They constituted the sixth to ninth titles of the Constitution. The electoral system was of an indirect nature and proceeded as follows:

Title Six: Elections in general 
The initial provision for the elections read as follows:

The sixth title comprises articles 17 to 19, and establishes the legal framework by which the collegiate instances for electoral purposes were constituted, called Parish Assemblies whose competencies were to elect an Elector or Electors according to the demographics of the parish (in accordance with the provisions of Article 23 of the Constitution), said Assemblies were previously organized by the civil authority of each parish and two noble neighbors designated by the Municipal Council of the Canton, who had to form a list of individuals who possessed the right of parish suffrage (as stated in the fifth constitutional title), said list which was the registry of the electoral mass of the parish, had to be exhibited to the public.

At the same time, another list was organized consisting of the candidates who met the qualifications (set forth in Article 27 of the Constitution) to be Elector or Electors, and were sent to the first civil authority of the Canton and to the Municipal Council who verified their content in order to qualify the evaluated candidates.

Title Seven: Parish Assemblies 
It includes articles 20 through 31, and establishes the structure of the Parish Assemblies. According to the aforementioned procedures, only those Citizens could be Electors who:

In accordance with the provisions of the previous Constitutional Title, the organization of the aforementioned Parish Assemblies proceeded as stipulated in the following article:

Once each member of the Assembly had voted, the parochial elections were considered concluded, the Judge who presided over the Assembly proceeded to send to the civil authority of the Canton (designated according to the Laws), the registry of sessions in his Parish, a closed and sealed envelope, and then together with the authorities of the Municipal Council opened the mentioned envelope and began the scrutiny process, the results were finally made public. The Elector candidate who had the majority of affirmative votes was considered elected, if there was an equality of votes, Article 30 stated that chance was the deciding factor.

Title Eight: Of the Assemblies, or Electoral Colleges 
It includes articles 32 to 43, and establishes the functions and structures of this type of instances.

In accordance with the aforementioned procedures, the Electoral Assemblies or Colleges were composed of:

The purpose of these Assemblies, once their members met, was as follows:

Title Nine: Provisions Common to Parish Assemblies and Electoral College 
It includes articles 44 to 47, and establishes the guiding principles on the functionality of the referred Assemblies in the sessions they hold.

From the Legislative Body

Title Ten: Legislative Power 
It includes Articles 48 and 49, and establishes the body that assumes the legislative functions, such as the Congress, composed of the House of Representatives and the Senate. They had to meet every year, starting on January 20, in the capital of the Republic, for 30 more days, when necessary.

Title Eleventh: The House of Representatives 
It includes articles 50 to 59, and establishes the composition of the House of Representatives or lower chamber of Congress, and the requirements for citizens who wished to be part of it under the title of Deputy, who remained in office for a period of four years. At the same time, the procedure for the dismissal of the directive of the House in case of being the object of accusations by some members of the same was also set forth.

They could be members of this Chamber according to Article 52:

According to the provisions of Article 57 of the Constitution, these were the competencies of the House of Representatives:

Title Twelfth: The Chamber of Senators 
It comprises Articles 60 to 71. It is similarly structured to the title referring to the House of Representatives, establishing the composition of the Chamber of Senators or upper chamber of Congress, and the requirements for citizens who wished to be part of it under the title of Senator, who remained in office for a period of four years. At the same time, and similar to the lower chamber, the procedure for the dismissal of the directive of the Chamber in case of being the object of accusations by some members of the same.

They could be members of this Chamber according to Article 62:

According to the provisions of Article 65 of the Constitution, these were the competencies of the Chamber of Senators:

Title Thirteen: On the economic functions and provisions common to both Chambers 
It comprises Articles 72 through 86, and establishes certain constitutional rules on:

 The opening of sessions and place of residence.
 The elaboration of their own rules of procedure.
 The other constitutional magistrates who may not be Deputies or Senators.
 The immunity and indemnity that the members of the Congress enjoy in the exercise of their functions.

Title Fourteen: Of the powers of the Congress 
It establishes the operative powers of Congress as a legislative body.

Title Fifteenth: On the formation of laws and their promulgation. 
It includes Articles 88 to 102, and establishes the administrative procedure for the drafting, sanction and enactment of Laws. The initiative of a law could originate in any of the Chambers, and once the bill was drafted and approved, it was passed to the Executive for its enactment.

From the Executive Body

Title Sixteen: Executive Branch 
It includes articles 103 to 122, and establishes the structure and faculties of this public power. According to Article 103 of the Constitution, the Executive Power resided in a magistrate with the title of President of the Republic. Only Venezuelans by birth could be president, and have all the other qualities required for a Senator, elected by two thirds of the Electoral College for a period of four years without being eligible for immediate reelection after at least one constitutional term.

According to Article 109 of the Constitution, the Vice President of State was elected under the same requirements and procedures required for the President. The Vice President was elected two years after the election of the President of the Republic.

In case of absence of the President and Vice President, Article 114 stated that the absence of both was substituted by the Vice President of the Council of Government.

According to Article 117, the constitutional powers of the President of the Republic were used:
Also added to the presidential powers were special powers authorized by the Congress or the Council of Government in situations of armed internal commotion threatening internal security or sudden foreign invasion.

At the same time, Article 121 established certain limitations to the authority of the President of the Republic, such as:

Of the Judicial Power 
The first judicial magistracy resides in the Supreme Court of Justice, in the Superior Courts of Justice that are installed in 3 judicial districts; and in the tribunals and courts of important places of the Republic.

See also 

 La Cosiata

References 

Gran Colombia
1830 in politics
Simón Bolívar
Valencia, Venezuela
1830 in Venezuela
1830 in law